Esso is a trading name for the oil and gas company ExxonMobil.

Esso or ESSO may also refer to:

Esso (village), a village in Kamchatka Krai, Russia
Eric Esso (born 1994), Ghanaian footballer 
Joseph Esso, (born 1996), Ghanaian footballer
Laurent Esso (born 1942), Cameroonian politician
Solitoki Esso (fl. from 1979), Togolese politician

See also